The 105 Squadron of the Israeli Air Force, also known as The Scorpion, was founded in December 1950 as a Spitfire squadron and has since operated the P-51 Mustang, Dassault Super Mystere, IAI Sa'ar, and F-4 Phantom II. It currently operates F-16Ds at Ramat David Airbase.

The squadron won the 2009 "Skewer" competition.

Operating the F-4E Phantom II
The fifth and last Israeli Air Force F-4E Kurnass squadron, 105 was activated at Hatzor on March 31, 1975, under the command of Shmuel Gordon. The Scorpion received its mounts under Peace Echo V deliveries, flying the IAF's newest aircraft and latest blocks, and was soon the first IAF Squadron to introduce the AGM-78 Purple Fist anti-radiation missile. It flew its first operational bombing mission, against a PLO base in Lebanon, in September 1977. The squadron flew 335 sorties during the 1982 Lebanon War, primarily in the SEAD and close air support roles, and participated in operation Mole Cricket 19. It also scored the war's sole F-4E kill, when Ben-Ami Peri and David Oakman shot down a Syrian Air Force MiG-21 on June 11. It was disbanded in 1987 following IAF budget cuts. 105 Squadron Phantoms were distinguished by a red arrow along both sides of their fuselage, initially solid red but later white with red outlines.

References

Bibliography

External links

Global Security Profile

Israeli Air Force squadrons
Military units and formations established in 1950